Tim French is an American politician and a Republican member of the Wyoming Senate, representing District 18 since January 4, 2021.

Career 
Tim French is a member of both the Agriculture, State and Public Lands & Water Resources Committee and the Senate Judiciary Committee. He served on Park County's commission for 18 years before becoming a state representative. During his time as a county commissioner, he improved the information and technologies department of the county, and he helped with establishing a building for the county's grounds department.

Political viewpoints 
Tim French states that he is "pro-life, pro-second amendment, and pro-property rights." He is a supporter of the coal industry in the United States.

References

External links 
 Tim French's official website

Year of birth missing (living people)
Living people
Republican Party Wyoming state senators
County commissioners in Wyoming
People from Cody, Wyoming
People from Powell, Wyoming
21st-century American politicians